Gimritz is a village and a former municipality in the Saalekreis district, Saxony-Anhalt, Germany. Since 1 January 2011, it is part of the town Wettin-Löbejün.

References

Former municipalities in Saxony-Anhalt
Wettin-Löbejün